Solimões is the name often given to upper stretches of the Amazon River in Brazil from its confluence with the Rio Negro upstream to the border of Peru.

Geography
The Amazon / Solimões river just above the confluence of the Solimões and Rio Negro is already by far the largest river in the world, even though its two largest tributaries (the Negro and the Madeira River) have not yet contributed to the flow volume.

The Solimões portion of the Amazon River lies entirely in the state of Amazonas, Brazil, and some portion of the state is often referred to as the "Solimões region". The ecoregion of the Solimões River drainage basin is entirely tropical rainforest.

Etymology
An Amazonian aboriginal nation called Soriman was corrupted in  Portuguese to Solimão and Soliemoens, from which the name of this section of the river and region it drains is derived.

Use of the name Solimões for the upper Amazon is mostly confined to Brazilian speakers of Portuguese; the rest of the world refers to both the upper and lower portions of the river as the Amazon.

See also
 Marañón River
 List of rivers of Amazonas

References

 

 

Tributaries of the Amazon River
Rivers of Amazonas (Brazilian state)
·